Gilles Boisvert may refer to:
 Gilles Boisvert (ice hockey)
 Gilles Boisvert (artist)